Tachina testaceifrons is a species of fly in the genus Tachina of the family Tachinidae that is endemic to Germany.

References

Insects described in 1840
Diptera of Europe
Endemic fauna of Germany
testaceifrons